State Bank of Sikkim (SBS) is a state owned banking institution headquartered at Gangtok, Sikkim, India. The Bank operates within the jurisdiction of the State of Sikkim and in addition to banking services, State Bank of Sikkim handles treasury functions of State Government of Sikkim.

An autonomous body under the Government of Sikkim, it is not regulated by Reserve Bank of India unlike other banks in India. However, the Report of the Comptroller and Auditor General of India for the year ended March 2012 has recorded that the performance of State Bank of Sikkim generated 86 percent of the total profit earned by the state owned PSUs during the year.

The State Bank of Sikkim has completed 50 years (1968-2018) of existence during which it has continually worked in partnership with development projects in the state.

History 
State Bank of Sikkim was constituted and established in the year 1968 under the State Bank of Sikkim Proclamation, 1968. State Bank of Sikkim was initially headquartered at MG Marg, Gangtok and was later moved to the present location, where the Bank houses its Head Office as well as Main branch. Initially started with just one branch, today SBS has expanded to 40 branches (as of 2016-2017) in Sikkim. As on 8th Sept' 2018, the State Bank of Sikkim has altogether 46 branch offices and 3 Revenue Counters working on 24 x 7 basis. State Bank of Sikkim has today a branch network of 54 branch offices spread all over Sikkim with Revenue Counters numbering to 6 which includes 3 Counters on 24 x 7 basis.

Core Banking 
State Bank of Sikkim started Core Banking Solution (CBS) in April 2017 with just two branch offices and within a span of a year, all the branch offices are running on CBS platform. On the occasion of Closing Ceremony of a year long Golden Jubilee year celebration of the bank, the Core Banking Solution was formally and officially launched by the Hon'ble Chief Minister, Government of Sikkim on 8 September 2018.

Branches
As of 2022 the Branches of State Bank of Sikkim are as follows:

 Gangtok district: Bojoghari Gangtok, Deorali Gangtok,  Khamdong, Makha,  Manan Kendra Gangtok, Gangtok Head Office, Nandok, Rakdong-Tintek,    Ranipool, Ranka,  Sang, Sichey Gangtok, Singtam, SNT Gangtok, Tadong Gangtok, Tsomgo, Sochakgang Gangtok, Secretariat Gangtok, Gangtok check post, Lal Bazar Gangtok.

 Pakyong district:  Pakyong Bazar, Pakyong DC office, Rangpo Check Post, Mamring East, Parakha, Rorathang, Rongli, Rhenock, Majhitar,  Rangpo Bazaar.

 Mangan district: Chungthang, Mangan, Passingdong, Phodong, Lachen, Lachung, Kabi.

Gyalshing district:  Darap, Legship, Dentam, Gyalshing, Martam, Rinchenpong, Rabdentse, Tashiding, Yuksom.

Namchi district: Jorethang, Kewzing, Melli Bazar, Melli Check Post, Ravangla, Namchi Bazar, Namchi Extension Counter, Namthang, Temi, Yangyang.

Soreng district: Sombaria, Soreng, Chumbong Extension Counter, Nayabazar, Mangalbaria.

References

External links 

Banks established in 1968